Sorbitan monopalmitate (SMP) is a food additive, permitted by the EU. It is entry E495 in the E number list of permitted food additives.
It is also known under the trade name Span 40.

Synopsis
Sorbitan monopalmitate has been known since at least 1959.

Around 2000, SMP was permitted by the EU in bakery products, icings, marmalades, simulations of milk and cream, beverage whiteners, liquid concentrates of fruit and herbs, sorbets, emulsified sauces, food supplements and chewing gum amongst others.

SMP is a polysorbate that is derived from the mixture of partial esters of sorbitol treated with palmitic acid. SMP is a lipophilic surfactant. It may be found in combination with polysorbates. It is used to modify crystallisation of fats. It is insoluble in water. Up to 25 mg/kg bodyweight can be processed by humans. SMP is metabolized to sorbitol and palmitic acid, without any apparent side effects. The use of animal fats, like pork, in the production of SMP is possible.

References

E-number additives
Edible thickening agents
Fatty acid esters
Food stabilizers
Palmitate esters